Valentina Tereshkova (born 1937) is a Russian cosmonaut and the first woman to travel in outer space.

Tereshkova may also refer to:
Tereshkova (crater), a lunar crater
Tereshkova Street, Novosibirsk, a street in Akademgorodok, Russia

People with the surname
Olga Tereshkova (born 1984), a Kazakh former sprinter who specialized in the 400 metres

See also 
Terekhov
Tereshkov

Russian-language surnames